White Hunter Black Heart is a 1990 American adventure drama film produced, directed by, and starring Clint Eastwood and based on the 1953 book of the same name by Peter Viertel. Viertel also co-wrote the script with James Bridges and Burt Kennedy. The film is a thinly disguised account of Viertel's experiences while working on the 1951 film The African Queen, which was shot on location in Africa at a time when location shoots outside of the United States for American films were very rare. The main character, brash director John Wilson (played by Eastwood) is based on real-life director John Huston. Jeff Fahey plays Pete Verrill, a character based on Viertel. George Dzundza's character is based on African Queen producer Sam Spiegel. Marisa Berenson's character Kay Gibson and Richard Vanstone's character Phil Duncan are based on Katharine Hepburn and Humphrey Bogart, respectively.  This was the last film that James Bridges wrote the screenplay for before dying in 1993.

Plot
In the early 1950s, Pete Verrill is invited by his friend, director John Wilson, to rewrite the script for Wilson's latest project: a film with the working title of The African Trader. The hard living, irreverent Wilson convinces producer Paul Landers to have the film completely shot on location in Africa, even though doing so would be extremely expensive. Wilson explains to Verrill that his motivation for this has nothing to do with the film - Wilson, a lifelong hunter, wants to fulfill his dream of going on an African safari; he even purchases a set of finely crafted hunting rifles and charges them to the studio.

Upon landing in Entebbe, Wilson and Verrill spend several days at a luxury hotel while Verrill finishes the script and Wilson makes arrangements for the safari. Verrill finds himself growing fond of Wilson after the latter defends him against a fellow guest who makes antisemitic remarks in front of Verrill (who happens to be Jewish) and challenges the hotel manager to a fistfight after witnessing him insult and belittle a black waiter for spilling a drink. The two men constantly argue over Verrill's changes to the script, particularly his insistence that Wilson does not use his original planned ending, where all of the main characters are killed on-screen.

Wilson hires a pilot to fly him and Verrill out to the hunting camp of safari guide Zibelinsky and his African tracker Kivu, whom Wilson is quick to bond with. The film's unit director, Ralph Lockhart, is also present and insists that Wilson start pre-production before the cast arrives, to which Wilson replies he'll do so after he shoots a "tusker". Verrill gradually becomes disenchanted with Wilson, who keeps going out to hunt despite his poor health and seems completely indifferent to the success of his movie. He even questions why Wilson would want to kill such a magnificent beast.

Confronted, Wilson tells Verrill off and accuses him of "playing it safe" and not wanting to risk anything. He calls hunting a "sin that you can get a license for" and doesn't try to convince Verrill otherwise when he threatens to resign and go back to London. Landers arrives in Entebbe and insists that Verrill stay on, revealing that the studio is at risk of bankruptcy if the movie isn't finished. When Verrill does return, he is informed by Lockhart that Wilson, without consulting anyone, has decided to move the entire production to Kivu's home village despite Landers spending most of the budget on a prefabricated set.

The cast, now unable to stay at the hotel, go to Zibelinsky's camp and find Wilson waiting for them with a lavish banquet. He humiliates Landers and takes advantage of several days of rain to resume his safari, now accompanied by professional elephant hunter Ogilvy. Verrill follows after Wilson again taunts him for cowardice. Wilson finally gets his chance to kill the "tusker", but when the time comes to shoot, he suddenly finds he can't pull the trigger. The elephant suddenly charges after seeing its child move too close to Wilson, and Kivu tries to scare it off only to be fatally gored by the elephant's tusks.

Wilson, horrified by Kivu's death, returns to the set. He sees the villagers beating drums and asks Ogilvy what they mean. Ogilvy replies that they are communicating to everyone how Kivu died: "white hunter, black heart". Recognizing that he is ultimately to blame for what happened, Wilson tells Verrill that he was right: the film does need a happy ending after all. Sitting in his director's chair as the actors and crew take their places to film the opening scene of The African Trader, a now humbled and broken Wilson silently mutters "Action".

Cast
 Clint Eastwood as John Wilson
 Jeff Fahey as Pete Verrill
 Alun Armstrong as Ralph Lockhart, unit director
 George Dzundza as Paul Landers
 Charlotte Cornwell as Miss Wilding, Wilson's secretary
 Norman Lumsden as George, Wilson's butler
 Marisa Berenson as Kay Gibson
 Richard Vanstone as Phil Duncan
 Catherine Neilson as Irene Saunders, an aspiring writer who pitches her film to Wilson
 Edward Tudor-Pole as Reissar, British partner
 Roddy Maude-Roxby as Thompson, British partner
 Richard Warwick as Basil Fields, British partner
 Boy Mathias Chuma as Kivu
 Timothy Spall as Hodkins, bush pilot
 Clive Mantle as Harry, Hotel Manager

Production
During the 1950s, Ray Bradbury wrote an unproduced version of the film for MGM.

At times, Eastwood, as the John Huston-like character of John Wilson, can be heard drawing out his vowels, speaking in Huston's distinctive style.

The film was shot on location in Kariba, Zimbabwe, and surrounds including at Lake Kariba, Victoria Falls, and Hwange, over two months in the summer of 1989. Some interiors were shot in and around Pinewood Studios in England. The boat used in the film was constructed in England of glass fibre and shipped to Africa for filming. It was electrically powered, and was fitted with motors and engines by special-effects expert John Evans to make the boat appear to be steam-powered. The elephant gun used in the film was a £65,000 double-barrelled rifle of the type preferred by most professional hunters and their clients in this era. It was made by Holland & Holland, the gunmakers who also made the gun used by Huston when he was in Africa for The African Queen in 1951.  The White Hunter Black Heart filmmakers took great care with the gun and sold it back to Holland & Holland after filming "unharmed, unscratched, unused."

Critical reception
The film was entered into the 1990 Cannes Film Festival. The film received positive reviews with review tallying website Rotten Tomatoes reporting that 30 out of the 36 reviews they tallied were positive giving a 83% rating. The consensus reads: "White Hunter Black Heart is powerful, intelligent, and subtly moving, a fascinating meditation on masculinity and the insecurities of artists."

The film has grown significantly in critical stature, especially in light of the films Eastwood made immediately afterwards. Many of these, like White Hunter, Black Heart, turned out to be self-reflexive and self-conscious works criticizing and deconstructing Eastwood's own iconography. Jim Hoberman of The Village Voice hailed it as "Eastwood’s best work before Unforgiven...[an] underrated hall-of-mirrors movie about movie-inspired megalomania." Dave Kehr and Jonathan Rosenbaum consider it a masterpiece, with the latter pointing out the Brechtian nature of Eastwood's performance, as he never disappears into the role he is playing; instead, Eastwood is always recognizably his unique star persona while showing us what he imagines Huston (i.e. Wilson) to have been. The result is "a running commentary on his two subjects, Huston and himself—the ruminations and questions of a free man."

Box office
White Hunter Black Heart's gross theatrical earnings reached just over $2 million, well below the film's $24 million budget.

References

External links
 
 
 
 Movie stills

1990 films
1990s action films
1990 drama films
American adventure drama films
1990s English-language films
Films about films
Films about film directors and producers
Films directed by Clint Eastwood
Films produced by Clint Eastwood
Malpaso Productions films
Films about hunters
Films shot in Zimbabwe
Films set in Africa
Films about elephants
Films shot in Zambia
Films à clef
Films scored by Lennie Niehaus
Cultural depictions of Humphrey Bogart
Warner Bros. films
1990s American films